Stanley Hot Springs is a series of thermal springs located in the Selway–Bitterroot Wilderness in Idaho County, Idaho, United States.

Location
From Lewiston, Idaho, take U.S. Route 12 east toward Lolo Pass. Trailhead parking is located past the 'A' and 'B' loops. There is no parking fee. Access to the hot springs is via Trail #211.

Seasonal note
The bridge crossing Boulder Creek washed away in the winter of 1998–99. The USFS has not yet expressed intent to rebuild it. , the hot springs are accessed as follows:

Ford the creek and head for the log jam, located a little downriver from the trail site. The logs are well stuck in place and make a bridge across the river. Follow the logs zig zagging across the river to the center island. There is a log with a rope strung into a makeshift bridge which can be used to cross over the last half of the creek.

The optimal times to visit are after the spring runoff and before heavy snowfall, although it is possible to snowshoe into the hot springs.

Water profile
The geothermally heated water emerges at 106°F / 41°C.

References

External links

Hot springs of Idaho
Protected areas of Idaho County, Idaho
Bodies of water of Idaho County, Idaho